is a song by Japanese rock band Ogre You Asshole and the title track of their first EP released independently on October 10, 2005.

Track listing

References

2006 EPs
Ogre You Asshole albums